Pipat is a village in Chhatarpur district, Madhya Pradesh. It is 23 km from Chhatarpur city, 15 km from Khajuraho, 10 km from Rajnagar and 18 km from khajwa town.

Geography 
It has an average elevation of 227 metres (744.751  and its area is 590 hectares.

Demographics 
At the 2011 census, Pipat had a population of 2,769.

Chhatarpur